The Nag's Head is a Grade II listed public house at 10 James Street, Covent Garden, London, WC2.

History
The pub was built in about 1900 and the architect was P. E. Pilditch. In late 1951 the landlords, Whitbread, converted it to a theatrical theme and it is thought to have been one of the first English themed pubs which were popular in the mid twentieth century as brewers tried to appeal to a younger generation who were not so interested in the traditional entertainments of their parents.

References

External links

Covent Garden
Grade II listed pubs in the City of Westminster